Angus Scott is the name of

 Angus Scott (athlete) (1927–1990), British sprinter
 Angus Scott (politician) (1876–1958), Chairman of London County Council
 Angus Scott (rugby union) (born 1978), Australian rugby union player; see 2002 Super 12 season 
 Angus Scott (television presenter) (born 1967), British sports television presenter

See also
 Angus, Scotland
 Angus Scott-Young (born 1997), Australian rugby union player